The 1969–70 season was Mansfield Town's 33rd season in the Football League and 9th in the Third Division, they finished in 6th position with 53 points.

Final league table

Results

Football League Third Division

FA Cup

League Cup

Squad statistics
 Squad list sourced from

Notes

References
General
 Mansfield Town 1969–70 at soccerbase.com (use drop down list to select relevant season)

Specific

Mansfield Town F.C. seasons
Mansfield Town